Parasorbic acid is the cyclic lactone of sorbic acid. Thermal treatment or hydrolysis converts the lactone to sorbic acid.

Toxicity 

Parasorbic acid is toxic and causes indigestion and nausea, however cooking and exposure to moisture convert it to the benign food preservative sorbic acid.

See also
 δ-Valerolactone
 Sorbic acid

References

Delta-lactones
Preservatives
Enones